Anthropological Survey of India (AnSI) is the apex Indian government organisation involved in anthropological studies and field data research for human and cultural aspects, working primarily in the fields of physical anthropology and cultural anthropology, while maintaining a strong focus on indigenous populations. It also attempts to document the cultures of other communities and religious groups.

History
Anthropological Research in India was founded 1945 in Varanasi and shifted to the Indian Museum at Calcutta in 1948.

In 1916, the Zoological and Anthropological sections of the Museum together became a new entity the Zoological Survey of India. Later, in 1945, the Anthropology section formed into an independent body, the Anthropological Survey of India (AnSI), with Biraja Sankar Guha as the initial director and Verrier Elwin,  deputy director.

Operating under the Ministry of Culture, Government of India, it is headquartered in Kolkata and has branches in Port Blair (Andaman and Nicobar), Shillong, Dehra Dun, Udaipur, Nagpur (with Central Library of AnSI), and Mysore (established in 1960).

References

Further reading

External links
 

Government agencies established in 1945
1945 establishments in India
Research institutes in Kolkata
Cultural organisations based in India
Anthropology organizations
Ministry of Culture (India)
Anthropology